River is a given name of English origin taken from river, the English word for a naturally flowing watercourse. 

It is in common use in English-speaking countries such as the United States for both males and females.   It has ranked among the top 1,000 names for newborn boys in the United States since 2000 and among the top 150 most popular names for American boys in 2020. It has ranked among the top 1,000 girls for American girls since 2009 and ranked among the top 200 names given to newborn American girls in 2020.

Notable people with the name include:
River Alexander (born 1999), American actor
River Allen (footballer) (born 1995), English footballer
River Butcher (born 1982), American comedian
River Cracraft (born 1994), American football player
River Huang (born 1989), Taiwanese actor
River Phoenix (1970–1993), American actor and musician
River Radamus (born 1998), American alpine skier

Notes